Emmett Thompson (born 1881, date of death unknown) was a Guyanese cricketer. He played in two first-class matches for British Guiana in 1903/04 and 1908/09.

See also
 List of Guyanese representative cricketers

References

External links
 

1881 births
Year of death missing
Guyanese cricketers
Guyana cricketers